The Monmouth Hawks baseball team is a varsity intercollegiate athletic team of Monmouth University in West Long Branch, New Jersey, United States. The team is a member of the Colonial Athletic Association, which is part of the National Collegiate Athletic Association's Division I. The team plays its home games at Monmouth Baseball Field in West Long Branch, New Jersey. The Hawks are coached by Dean Ehehalt.

, at least five Monmouth players, including Brad Brach and Ed Halicki, have played in Major League Baseball. Twenty players have been selected from the school in the Major League Baseball draft with the highest selection being Pat Light who was taken 37th overall in 2012.

See also
List of NCAA Division I baseball programs

References

External links